Sue Ann Downey (born May 8, 1945) is an American former model and beauty pageant titleholder who has held the Miss USA title and competed in the Miss Universe pageant.

Downey won the Miss Ohio USA title and then the Miss USA 1965 title.  She later competed in the 1965 Miss Universe pageant, where she placed Second Runner-up and the recipient of the Best National Costume award.

External links
Miss Ohio USA official website
Miss USA official website

1945 births
Female models from Ohio
Living people
Miss Universe 1965 contestants
Miss USA 1960s delegates
Miss USA winners
People from Columbus, Ohio
21st-century American women